is a chokehold in judo.  It is one of the twelve constriction techniques of Kodokan Judo in the Shime-waza list.

Examples of contest this finished

Variants 
Itachi jime
2017 World Judo Championships – Mixed team Round 2 -73 kg
Win Miklós Ungvári (HUN) (3:46) Benjamin Axus (FRA) Loss IJF movie
a variant grabbing back of uke's belt and using the back of tori's thigh
Budapest Grand Prix 2019 Round 2 -52 kg 
Loss Reka Pupp(Hungary) (2:44 katate jime(AJJF), okuri eri jime(IJF)) Chishima Maeda(Japan) Win IJF movie

See also
The Canon Of Judo

References

Judo technique
Grappling
Grappling hold
Grappling positions
Martial art techniques